This is a list of Members of Parliament (MPs) elected to the House of Commons of the United Kingdom by Northern Irish constituencies for the 53rd Parliament of the United Kingdom (2001 to 2005). There are 18 such constituencies, 11 of which were represented by Unionists and seven by Nationalists. It includes MPs elected at the 2001 United Kingdom general election, held on 7 June 2001.

The list is sorted by the name of the MP.

Sinn Féin MPs follow an abstentionist policy of not taking their seats in the House of Commons.

Composition

MPs

References

See also 

 Northern Ireland
2001-2005
MPs
2000s elections in Northern Ireland